Rodrigo Munilla (9 October 1976 − 18 June 2021) was an Argentine sports journalist who mainly worked in radio.

He rose to prominence in his career working along with well-known sports journalist Víctor Hugo Morales in Radio Continental and was the radio's credited journalist for the Argentine Football Association (AFA). His last work was for a football show on cable network C5N.

Munilla contracted COVID-19 in March 2021, during the COVID-19 pandemic in Argentina, and was hospitalized that month until his death from the disease on 18 June 2021.

References 

1976 births
2021 deaths
Argentine sports journalists
Deaths from the COVID-19 pandemic in Argentina
People from Buenos Aires